The Poncione di Vespero is a mountain of the Lepontine Alps, overlooking Airolo in the Swiss canton of Ticino.

References

External links
 Poncione di Vespero

Mountains of the Alps
Mountains of Switzerland
Mountains of Ticino
Lepontine Alps